Rhinochelys is an extinct genus of sea turtles belonging to the family Protostegidae.

Fossil records 
Fossils of Rhinochelys have been found in Cenomanian-age marine deposits of southern England, Lebanon, and France.

Species 
Three species of Rhinochelys are recognized:
 Rhinochelys pulchriceps (Owen, 1851)
 Rhinochelys amaberti Moret, 1935
 Rhinochelys nammourensis Tong, Hirayama, Makhoul & Escuillie, 2006

Rhinochelys cantabrigiensis and R. elegans, both named by Richard Lydekker in 1889, are recovered by Scavezzoni and Fischer (2018) as closer to Desmatochelys than to Rhinochelys and possibly are not congeneric with Rhinochelys.

Bibliography
 Hirayama, R., 1997: Distribution and diversity of Cretaceous chelonioids. 225–243. in Callaway, J. M. & Nicholls, E. L., (eds.), 1997: Ancient marine reptiles. Academic Press, San Diego, London, Boston, New York, Sydney, Tokyo, Toronto, 1997, pp. xlvi - 501
 Moody, R. T. J., 1997: The paleogeography of marine and coastal turtles of the North Atlantic and Trans-Saharan regions. 259–278 in Callaway, J. M. & Nicholls, E. L., (eds.) 1997: Ancient Marine Reptiles. Academic Press, San Diego, London, Boston, New York, Sydney, Tokyo, Toronto, 1997, xlvi-501

References

Protostegidae
Cretaceous turtles
Prehistoric turtles of Europe
Extinct turtles